Hermitage is a rural locality in the local government area (LGA) of Central Highlands in the Central LGA region of Tasmania. The 2016 census recorded a population of nil for the state suburb of Hermitage.

History 
Hermitage was gazetted as a locality in 1966. The name is believed to come from the property of an early settler in the district.

Geography
The River Ouse forms the western boundary. The Shannon River forms part of the eastern boundary before flowing through from east to south-west where it joins the Ouse.

Road infrastructure 
Route C178 (Waddamana Road) runs through from north to east.

References

Towns in Tasmania
Localities of Central Highlands Council